Prazeres Cemetery is one of the largest cemeteries in Lisbon, Portugal; it is located in the freguesia (civil parish) of Estrela, in western Lisbon (formerly, within the parish of Prazeres). It is considered to be one of the most beautiful and famous cemeteries in the world. It is home to the Mausoleum of the Dukes of Palmela, the largest mausoleum in Europe.

Prazeres Cemetery is the resting place for many famous personalities, including Prime Ministers and Presidents of Portugal, notable literary figures such as author Ramalho Ortigão, famous artists like painters Columbano Bordalo Pinheiro or Roque Gameiro, prominent musical figures like pianist Alexandre Rey Colaço or composer João Domingos Bomtempo, and numerous other notable burials, especially from the Portuguese nobility.

History
Prazeres Cemetery was founded in 1833 after the outbreak of cholera in the city, along with Alto de São João Cemetery. It was originally named Cemitério Ocidental de Lisboa (Western Cemetery of Lisbon). The cemetery is exclusively made up of mausoleums.

Since 2001, a portion of the cemetery's auxiliary buildings have been converted into a museum.

Amália Rodrigues, famous as the "Queen of Fado", and Aquilino Ribeiro, famed novelist, were both buried at Prazeres Cemetery prior to their reinterment at the National Pantheon. Famed poet Fernando Pessoa was also buried at Prazeres prior to his reinterment at Jerónimos Monastery.

Gallery

Notable burials

 1st Count of Bonfim, famed statesman
 1st Count of Farrobo, noted patron of the arts
 1st Count of São Januário, founder of the Lisbon Geographic Society
 1st Duke of Loulé, 21st & 24th Prime Minister of Portugal
 1st Duke of Palmela, 1st Prime Minister of Portugal
 1st Viscount of Castilho, noted writer
 "Alcipe", 4th Marquise of Alorna, noted poet
 Alexandre de Serpa Pinto, notable explorer
 Alexandre Rey Colaço, famed pianist
 Alfredo Keil, composer of the Portuguese national anthem
 Alfredo Marceneiro, notable fado singer
 Alfredo Roque Gameiro, famed artist
 Amélia Rey Colaço, famed actress
 Almada Negreiros, famous artist
 Anselmo José Braamcamp, 36th Prime Minister of Portugal
 António Augusto Carvalho Monteiro, 20th-c. Brazilian millionaire
 António Silva, famed actor
 Antonio Tabucchi, famed Italian author
 Carlos do Carmo, notable fado singer
 Carlos Paredes, Portuguese guitar player
 Carolina Beatriz Ângelo, famed physician and suffragette
 Cesário Verde, famed poet
 Columbano Bordalo Pinheiro, famous painter
 Cosme Damião, founder of S.L. Benfica
 Cottinelli Telmo, famed architect
 Curry Cabral, famed physician
 Elise, Countess of Edla, second wife of Ferdinand II of Portugal
 Fernando Namora, famed writer
 Fontes Pereira de Melo, 33rd & 35th Prime Minister of Portugal
 Francisco Craveiro Lopes, 12th President of Portugal
 Henrique Mitchell de Paiva Couceiro, noted monarchist
 Hermenegildo Capelo, famed general
 João do Canto e Castro, 5th President of Portugal
 João Domingos Bomtempo, famous classical piano composer
 Joaquim Mouzinho de Albuquerque, famous general
 José Malhoa, famous painter
 José Mendes Cabeçadas, 9th President of Portugal
 José Norton de Matos, famous general
 José Vianna da Motta, famed pianist and composer
 Manuel Carvalheiro, filmmaker and film theorist
 Maria Amália Vaz de Carvalho, famed poet
 Maria Barroso, 25th First Lady of Portugal
 Maria de Lourdes Pintasilgo, 108th Prime Minister of Portugal
 Mário Cesariny de Vasconcelos, famed poet
 Mário Soares, 25th President of Portugal
 Rafael Bordalo Pinheiro, famed artist
 Ramalho Ortigão, famed author

References

Bibliography
 Cultural Patrimony of Prazeres Cemetery at the Direção-Geral do Património Cultural

External links

 Cemitério dos Prazeres on Lisbon City Hall's website 
 Cemitério dos Prazeres on the Lisbon Tourism Board' website 
 

Cemeteries in Portugal
Buildings and structures in Lisbon
Tourist attractions in Lisbon